Robert Baker Girdlestone (1836–1923) was an Anglican cleric who ministered at St John's Downshire Hill, Hampstead. He studied at  Charterhouse, London, and Christ Church, Oxford, and was first principal of Wycliffe Hall, Oxford. A Hebrew scholar and head of the translation department of the British and Foreign Bible Society, he is best known for his reference work Synonyms of the Old Testament.

Life
Robert Baker Girdlestone was the seventh son of Charles Girdlestone, a Fellow of Balliol College, Oxford. R. B. Girdlestone was minister of St. John's Downshire Hill, Hampstead, then head of the translation department of the British and Foreign Bible Society, and first principal of Wycliffe Hall, Oxford, in the post from 1877 to 1889.

Family
His third son Gathorne Robert Girdlestone (1881–1950) was the first Nuffield Professor of Orthopaedic Surgery, and thereby the first professor of orthopaedics in Britain.

Works
 Synonyms of the Old Testament
 The Student’s Deuteronomy
 How to Study the English Bible
 The Foundations of the Bible: Studies in Old Testament Criticism
 Old Testament Theology and Modern Ideas
 Deuterographs: Duplicate Passages in the Old Testament, their Bearing on the Text and Compilation of the Hebrew Scriptures
 Doctor doctorum : the Teacher and the Book ; with some remarks on Old Testament criticism
 English Church Teaching on Faith, Life and Order
 Grammar of Prophecy
 Dies Irae: the judgement of the great day, viewed in the light of scripture and conscience (1869)
 The Final Judgment and Future Prospects of Mankind (1872)

References

1836 births
1923 deaths
British Hebraists
19th-century English Anglican priests
20th-century English Anglican priests
19th-century English writers
English religious writers
Principals of Wycliffe Hall, Oxford
Evangelical Anglican clergy
Evangelical Anglican biblical scholars